Francis Thomas (February 3, 1799 – January 22, 1876) was an American politician who served as the 26th Governor of Maryland from 1842 to 1845. He also served as a United States Representative from Maryland, representing at separate times the fourth, fifth, sixth, and seventh districts. He also served as United States minister to Peru from 1872 to 1875, and speaker of the Maryland House of Delegates in 1829.

Early life and career
Thomas was born in Frederick County, Maryland, close to South Mountain, known as "Merryland tract", and attended St. John's College of Annapolis, Maryland. He later studied law, and was admitted to the bar in 1820, commencing practice in Frankville, Maryland.

Maryland House of Delegates
He entered politics after becoming a member of the Maryland House of Delegates in 1822, 1827, and 1829, and served the last year as 34th Speaker of the House.

First tenure in the United States House of Representatives
Thomas was elected as a Jacksonian to the Twenty-second through Twenty-fourth Congresses and as a Democrat to the Twenty-fifth and Twenty-sixth Congresses, serving from March 4, 1831 until March 3, 1841). In Congress, he served as chairman of the Committee on the Judiciary (Twenty-fourth and Twenty-fifth Congresses), and as a member of the Committee on Naval Affairs (Twenty-sixth Congress). He also served as president of the Chesapeake & Ohio Canal Company in 1839 and 1840.

Governor of Maryland
In 1841, Thomas was elected Governor of Maryland, defeating challenger William Cost Johnson by a margin of 600 votes.  During his tenure as governor, he is perhaps best known for his highly publicized and violent divorce with his wife, Sally Campbell Preston McDowell. McDowell had left the marriage over claims of "violent jealous rages [that] made her fear for her life" and that prompted her father, Virginia Governor James McDowell, to seek out a bill of divorce from the Virginia General Assembly. Until that event, he had been a leading candidate for Democratic nomination for President of the United States, but the divorce seriously disrupted his chances in succeeding in the nomination, and thus he did not pursue it.

As governor, Thomas inherited a major state deficit that he would not resolve in his tenure. He proposed a direct tax upon the people, which was widely unpopular, and did not raise adequate funds to allow repudiation of the debt. He was also a staunch opponent of slavery, a unique position in a border-state like Maryland, decrying it as "altogether unworthy of enlightened statesmen, and should be by all patriots repudiated". He served as governor from 1842 until 1845, narrowly beating William Cost Johnson, who he succeeded as Maryland's 6th district congressman, in 1841 for a three-year term. Thomas was an unsuccessful candidate for reelection in 1844.

Return to Congress
After his term as governor, Thomas served as a member of the Maryland State Constitutional convention in 1850. He was again elected to the Thirty-seventh Congress as a Unionist, as an Unconditional Unionist to the Thirty-eighth and Thirty-ninth Congresses, and as a Republican to the Fortieth Congress, serving from March 4, 1861 until March 3, 1869. When he left the House in 1869, he had served a total nine terms over almost four decades. 

While in the House, Thomas served as a delegate to the National Union Convention at Philadelphia, Pennsylvania in 1866.

Collector of internal revenue for Maryland
Thomas served as collector of internal revenue for Maryland from 1870 until 1872.

Minister to Peru
Thomas was appointed by President Grant to serve as the United States Minister to Peru, and help this position from March 25, 1872 to July 9, 1875.

Retirement and death
After leaving the ministership to Peru he retired from public and professional life and devoted his time to agricultural pursuits.

On January 22, 1876, while overseeing improvements on his estate near Frankville, Maryland, a community that once existed along the Baltimore and Ohio Railroad in Garrett County, Thomas was killed instantly when he was struck by a locomotive. He is interred in a vault in Rose Hill Cemetery of Cumberland, Maryland.

References
 Retrieved on 2009-04-14

Our Campaigns profile

External links

1799 births
1876 deaths
People from Frederick County, Maryland
American people of Welsh descent
Jacksonian members of the United States House of Representatives from Maryland
19th-century American politicians
Democratic Party members of the United States House of Representatives from Maryland
Unionist Party members of the United States House of Representatives from Maryland
Unconditional Union Party members of the United States House of Representatives from Maryland
Republican Party members of the United States House of Representatives from Maryland
Governors of Maryland
Democratic Party governors of Maryland
Speakers of the Maryland House of Delegates
Maryland lawyers
People of Maryland in the American Civil War
19th-century American diplomats
Ambassadors of the United States to Peru
St. John's College (Annapolis/Santa Fe) alumni
Railway accident deaths in the United States
Accidental deaths in Maryland
Burials at Rose Hill Cemetery (Cumberland, Maryland)